The 1990 Fordham Rams football team was an American football team that represented Fordham University during the 1990 NCAA Division I-AA football season. In its first year of Patriot League competition, Fordham finished last in the league. 

In their fifth year under head coach Larry Glueck, the Rams compiled a 1–9 record. Craig Jones, Eric Schweiker, Matt Stover and Chip Smith were the team captains.

The Rams were outscored 342 to 147. Their winless (0–5) conference record placed last in the six-team Patriot League standings. 

Fordham played its home games at Jack Coffey Field on the university campus in The Bronx, New York City.

Schedule

References

Fordham
Fordham Rams football seasons
Fordham Rams football